The Aschenbach (in its upper course: Götzenbrunnenbächle) is a small river in Baden-Württemberg, Germany. It is an upper headstream of the Mühlbach near Oberrot.

See also
List of rivers of Baden-Württemberg

References

Rivers of Baden-Württemberg
Rivers of Germany